Kantorov or Kantorow is a jewish surname.

Etymology and spelling
In Israel and among Sephardi and Mizrahi Jews, the surname Hassan is derived as a spelling variant of Hazzan ("cantor") and the word Cantor in English, this prayer leader is often referred to as a cantor, a term also used in Christianity.

 List of variant spellings
 In French: Kantorow
 In Russian: Канторов

People

A
 Alexander Kantorov (born 1947), Russian conductor 
 Alexandre Kantorow (born 1997), French pianist

J
 Jean-Jacques Kantorow (born 1945), French violinist and conductor

See also 
 Cantor (surname)
 Kantor (surname)
 Kanter, surname

References

Jewish surnames